La Estancia may refer to:

 La Estancia, Sonora, Mexico
 La Estancia, El Salvador
 La Estancia de gaucho Cruz, a 1938 Argentine comedy film

See also
 Estancia (disambiguation)